The Siberian house martin or eastern house martin (Delichon lagopodum) is a passerine bird in the swallow family Hirundinidae. It breeds in rocky areas of northeastern Russia, Mongolia and northern China and winters in Myanmar, Laos, Vietnam and Cambodia. It was formerly considered conspecific with the common house martin.

Taxonomy
The Siberian house martin was formally described in 1811 by the German naturalist Peter Simon Pallas under the binomial name Hirundo lagopoda. He specified the locality as Dauria, a mountainous region to the east of Lake Baikal in Russia. The specific epithet combines the Ancient Greek lagōs meaning "hare" with pous, podos meaning foot. The Siberian house martin is now placed in the genus Delichon. This martin was formerly considered to be a subspecies of the common house martin but was promoted to species status based on morphological and vocal differences. The species is monotypic: no subspecies are recognised.

References

Siberian house martin
Birds of Russia
Birds of Mongolia
Birds of Myanmar
Siberian house martin
Taxa named by Peter Simon Pallas